The Hildebrand Mill on Flint Creek in Colcord, Delaware County, Oklahoma was built c. 1845 and served hill people of the Old Cherokee Nation territory for more than 125 years.  It is located not far from Siloam Springs, Arkansas.  It was listed on the National Register of Historic Places in 1972.

It served as a lumber mill and as a grist mill, and it was used during the American Civil War in support of the commissaries of both the North and the South.  Hildebrand and Proctor families feuded in the area.

The current building was built in 1907.  Its last operation by water power was to mill grain, up to 1935.  By gas-powered motor, it was used to cut lumber up to 1967.

References

Grinding mills on the National Register of Historic Places in Oklahoma
Buildings and structures in Delaware County, Oklahoma
Industrial buildings completed in 1907
Grinding mills in Oklahoma
National Register of Historic Places in Delaware County, Oklahoma